Reference (translit. Kharakteristika) is a 1985 Bulgarian drama film directed by Christo Christov. It was entered into the 14th Moscow International Film Festival.

Cast
 Ivaylo Geraskov as Paliev
 Itzhak Finzi as Penchev
 Lilyana Kovacheva as Chernoto Meri
 Joreta Nikolova as Lilyana
 Atanass Atanassov as Itzeto
 Plamen Serakov as Petzata
 Vassil Mihajlov as Krushev
 Georgi Kaloyanchev as Bay Luko

References

External links
 

1985 films
1985 drama films
1980s Bulgarian-language films
Films directed by Christo Christov
Bulgarian drama films